Toxic waste is any unwanted material in all forms that can cause harm (e.g. by being inhaled, swallowed, or absorbed through the skin). Mostly generated by industry,  consumer products like televisions, computers, and phones contain toxic chemicals that can pollute the air and contaminate soil and water. Disposing of such waste is a major public health issue.

Classifying toxic materials
Toxic materials are poisonous byproducts as a result of industries such as manufacturing, farming, construction, automotive, laboratories, and hospitals which may contain heavy metals, radiation, dangerous pathogens, or other toxins. Toxic waste has become more abundant since the industrial revolution, causing serious global issues. Disposing of such waste has become even more critical with the addition of numerous technological advances containing toxic chemical components. Products such as cellular telephones, computers, televisions, and solar panels contain toxic chemicals that can harm the environment if not disposed of properly to prevent the pollution of the air and contamination of soils and water. A material is considered toxic when it causes death or harm by being inhaled, swallowed, or absorbed through the skin.

The waste can contain chemicals, heavy metals, radiation, dangerous pathogens, or other toxins. Even households generate hazardous waste from items such as batteries, used computer equipment, and leftover paints or pesticides. Toxic material can be either human-made and others are naturally occurring in the environment. Not all hazardous substances are considered toxic.

The United Nations Environment Programme (UNEP) has identified 11 key substances that pose a risk to human health:
 Arsenic: used in making electrical circuits, as an ingredient in pesticides, and as a wood preservative. It is classified as a carcinogen.
 Asbestos: is a material that was once used for the insulation of buildings, and some businesses are still using this material to manufacture roofing materials and brakes. Inhalation of asbestos fibers can lead to lung cancer and asbestosis.
 Cadmium: is found in batteries and plastics. It can be inhaled through cigarette smoke or digested when included as a pigment in food. Exposure leads to lung damage, irritation of the digestive tract, and kidney disease.
 Chromium: is used as brick lining for high-temperature industrial furnaces, as a solid metal used for making steel, and in chrome plating, manufacturing dyes and pigments, wood preserving, and leather tanning. It is known to cause cancer, and prolonged exposure can cause chronic bronchitis and damage lung tissue.
 Clinical wastes: such as syringes and medication bottles can spread pathogens and harmful microorganisms, leading to a variety of illnesses.
 Cyanide: a poison found in some pesticides and rodenticides. In large doses, it can lead to paralysis, convulsions, and respiratory distress.
 Lead: is found in batteries, paints, and ammunition. When ingested or inhaled can cause harm to the nervous and reproductive systems, and kidneys.
 Mercury: used for dental fillings and batteries. It is also used in the production of chlorine gas. Exposure can lead to birth defects and kidney and brain damage
 PCBs, or polychlorinated biphenyls, are used in many manufacturing processes, by the utility industry, and in paints and sealants. Damage can occur through exposure, affecting the nervous, reproductive, and immune systems, as well as the liver.
 POPs, persistent organic pollutants. They are found in chemicals and pesticides and may lead to nervous and reproductive system defects. They can bio-accumulate in the food chain or persist in the environment and be moved great distances through the atmosphere.
 Strong acids and alkalis used in manufacturing and industrial production. They can destroy tissue and cause internal damage to the body.

The most overlooked toxic and hazardous wastes are the household products in everyday homes that are improperly disposed of such as old batteries, pesticides, paint, and car oil. Toxic waste can be reactive, ignitable, and corrosive. In the United States, these wastes are regulated under the Resource Conservation and Recovery Act (RCRA).
 Reactive wastes are those that can cause explosions when heated, mixed with water or compressed. They can release toxic gases into the air. They are unstable even in normal conditions. An example is lithium–sulfur batteries.
 Ignitable wastes have flash points of less than 60 degrees Celsius. They are very combustible and can cause fires. Examples are solvents and waste oils.
 Corrosive wastes are liquids capable of corroding metal containers. These are acids or bases that have pH levels of less than or equal to 2, or greater than or equal to 12.5. An example is battery acid.

With the increase of worldwide technology, there are more substances that are considered toxic and harmful to human health. Technology growth at this rate is extremely daunting for civilization and can eventually lead to more harm/negative outcomes. Some of this technology includes cell phones and computers. Such items have been given the name e-waste or EEE, which stands for Electrical and Electronic Equipment. This term is also used for goods such as refrigerators, toys, and washing machines. These items can contain toxic components that can break down into water systems when discarded. The reduction in the cost of these goods has allowed for these items to be distributed globally without thought or consideration to managing the goods once they become ineffective or broken.

In the US, the Environmental Protection Agency (EPA) and state environmental agencies develop and enforce regulations on the storage, treatment, and disposal of hazardous waste. The EPA requires that toxic waste be handled with special precautions, and be disposed of in designated facilities around the country. Also, many US cities have collection days where household toxic waste is gathered. Some materials that may not be accepted at regular landfills are ammunition, commercially generated waste, explosives/shock sensitive items, hypodermic needles/syringes, medical waste, radioactive materials, and smoke detectors.

Health effects
Toxic wastes often contain carcinogens, and exposure to these by some route, such as leakage or evaporation from the storage, causes cancer to appear at increased frequency in exposed individuals. For example, a cluster of the rare blood cancer polycythemia vera was found around a toxic waste dump site in northeast Pennsylvania in 2008.

The Human & Ecological Risk Assessment Journal conducted a study that focused on the health of individuals living near municipal landfills to see if it would be as harmful as living near hazardous landfills. They conducted a 7-year study that specifically tested for 18 types of cancers to see if the participants had higher rates than those that don't live around landfills. They conducted this study in western Massachusetts within a 1-mile radius of the North Hampton Regional Landfill.

People encounter these toxins buried in the ground, in stream runoff, in groundwater that supplies drinking water, or in floodwaters, as happened after Hurricane Katrina. Some toxins, such as mercury, persist in the environment and accumulate. As a result of the bioaccumulation of mercury in both freshwater and marine ecosystems, predatory fish are a significant source of mercury in human and animal diets. Toxic Waste." National Geographic. National Geographic, 2010. Web. 26 Apr 2010.

Prevalence of Toxic Waste Sites in the United States'

In the United States today millions of Americans live near a toxic waste site that is in a radius of three miles of where they currently reside. For example, In February 2022 it was found that “75 percent of Black Americans more likely to live near waste-producing facilities.” Residents that live in or near communities that are 1.8 miles around a Superfund or hazardous site have a “high risk for life-long and long-term mental health and physical health challenges, including cancer, birth defects, and developmental disabilities.” There are an estimated 21 million people that reside within a mile of these sites allowing the harsh chemicals and toxins, such as lead and mercury, that have escaped to enter nearby water supplies, to affect the air quality, and ground conditions resulting in destructive environmental surroundings. In the past, recent years' climate change increasing severe rainstorms, flooding, and winds from hurricanes have a greater possibility to disrupt the content of these toxic waste sites allowing unstable organic compounds to go back into the environment.

Toxic Lead Waste and Disease in Three Latin American Countries

It can be seen that in Argentina, Mexico, and Uruguay there has been an increase in industrial development, urbanization, and socioeconomic forces. As these industries grow there is an underlying consequence of pollution that comes from environmental exposure to hazardous waste. When people are exposed to this pollution, they suffer negative health effects. With diseases on the rise, the disability-adjusted life year (DALY) starts to decline, so the time the average person lives decreases, especially in low to middle-income countries.

These low to middle-income countries (LMIC) have minimal resources to deal with toxic waste, such as “inadequate regulation, the informality of many industries, poor surveillance, and improper disposal of contaminants.” For example, “lead is still used for glazing artisanal ceramics despite the availability of less hazardous alternatives.” Lead enters the soil and water sources if not kept under control. Children are more susceptible than adults to absorbing more lead if exposed early on, causing them to have “behavioral problems in adolescence, IQ decrements, cognitive impairment, and decreased visuospatial skills.” If adults are exposed occupationally, they can have higher rates of hypertension than the average person. Men can result in low sperm count and females can result in miscarriages.

In order to further quantify the burden of diseases caused by toxic wastes TSIP, Toxic Sites Identification Program, “ identifies active and abandoned hazardous waste sites resulting from both formal and informal industrial activities in LMICs”.  As an investigation begins a key pollutant is sought out and identified. For example, “Heavy metals are the most commonly occurring key pollutant, with ingestion of contaminated soils being the most commonly occurring route of exposure listed in the TSIP database”. Argentina, Mexico, and Uruguay were chosen since they had more available data after meeting certain criteria. As of now, there are five criteria that have to be met in order for a hazardous waste site to be included in the analysis; " a biological or environmental sample had to be present; a population at risk had to be specified; the location of the site was represented by GPS coordinates, and a description of the activities leading to contamination were outlined.”  To measure the amount of lead in the soil a handheld X-ray fluorescence (XRF) spectrometer was used. When this method seemed unavailable and an area was suspected of having to lead contamination, the blood of individuals was tested to show the amount the people who were exposed to lead.

The exposure data were collected from a total of 129 hazardous waste sites distributed across Argentina (n = 23), Mexico (n = 62), and Uruguay (n = 44). In Figs. 1 and 2 the sites of geographical distributions are shown. An estimated population of 316,703 individuals were at risk of exposure (mean = 2455; median = 250 per site), which is approximately 0.19% of the total population of all three countries. There was an estimation of 80,021 individuals who were women of childbearing age (15–49 years of age), and 122,084 individuals who were younger than 18 years of age.

Dioxins and Solid Waste Disposal in Campania, Italy

In recent years in the region of Campania, Italy there has been a rise in illegal dumping and burning of toxic and solid waste. In response to this, there has been a rise of dangerous chemical molecules like dioxins that are carcinogenic, which implies that they have the potential to cause cancer, that is appearing in humans and animals. For example, there has been a recent increase in sheep that have been born in contaminated areas that have, “higher rates of chromosome fragility, higher mortality, and a higher incidence of abnormal fetal development when compared with sheep raised in non-contaminated areas.”

To assess the causal relations between cancer mortality and congenital malformations in humans coming from illegal dumping a map was drawn using the geographical locations of the sites.  

As one can see most of these sites are located in Campania where Naples and Caserta are based.

           The spread of dioxin through food consumption is primarily due to the animal products from the animals that were raised in the geographical locations where dioxins were the highest. Researchers tested mammalian milk from these areas and saw that the levels of dioxin were over the suggested amount. This was greatly seen as an issue because humans have the highest capability to concentrate the dioxin in their fat tissues. To test this, 94 women in Campania who were breastfeeding had samples of their breast milk tested and it was found that every woman had dioxin in their breastmilk. A correlation was also discovered that the older you were the more dioxin was in your breastmilk. 

Handling and disposal

One of the biggest problems with today's toxic material is how to dispose of it properly. Before the passage of modern environmental laws (in the US, this was in the 1970s), it was legal to dump such wastes into streams, rivers, and oceans, or bury them underground in landfills. The US Clean Water Act, enacted in 1972, and RCRA, enacted in 1976, created nationwide programs to regulate the handling and disposal of hazardous wastes.

The agriculture industry uses over 800,000 tons of pesticides worldwide annually that contaminate soils, and eventually infiltrate into groundwater, which can contaminate drinking water supplies. The oceans can be polluted from the stormwater runoff of these chemicals as well. Toxic waste in the form of petroleum oil can either spill into the oceans from pipe leaks or large ships, but it can also enter the oceans from everyday citizens dumping car oil into the rainstorm sewer systems. Disposal is the placement of waste into or on the land. Disposal facilities are usually designed to permanently contain waste and prevent the release of harmful pollutants to the environment.

The most common hazardous waste disposal practice is placement in a land disposal unit such as a landfill, surface impoundment, waste pile, land treatment unit, or injection well. Land disposal is subject to requirements under EPA's Land Disposal Restrictions Program. Injection wells are regulated under the federal Underground Injection Control program.

Organic wastes can be destroyed by incineration at high temperatures. However, if the waste contains heavy metals or radioactive isotopes, these must be separated and stored, as they cannot be destroyed. The method of storage will seek to immobilize the toxic components of the waste, possibly through storage in sealed containers, inclusion in a stable medium such as glass or a cement mixture, or burial under an impermeable clay cap. Waste transporters and waste facilities may charge fees; consequently, improper methods of disposal may be used to avoid paying these fees. Where the handling of toxic waste is regulated, the improper disposal of toxic waste may be punishable by fines or prison terms. Burial sites for toxic waste and other contaminated brownfield land may eventually be used as greenspace or redeveloped for commercial or industrial use.

History of US toxic waste regulation

The RCRA governs the generation, transportation, treatment, storage, and disposal of hazardous waste. The Toxic Substances Control Act (TSCA), also enacted in 1976, authorizes the EPA to collect information on all new and existing chemical substances, as well as to control any substances that were determined to cause unreasonable risk to public health or the environment. The Superfund law, passed in 1980, created a cleanup program for abandoned or uncontrolled hazardous waste sites.

There has been a long ongoing battle between communities and environmentalists versus governments and corporations about how strictly and how fairly the regulations and laws are written and enforced. That battle began in North Carolina in the late summer of 1979, as EPA's TSCA regulations were being implemented. In North Carolina, PCB-contaminated oil was deliberately dripped along rural Piedmont highways, creating the largest PCB spills in American history and a public health crisis that would have repercussions for generations to come. The PCB-contaminated material was eventually collected and buried in a landfill in Warren County, but citizens' opposition, including large public demonstrations, exposed the dangers of toxic waste, the fallibility of landfills than in use, and EPA regulations allowing landfills to be built on marginal, but politically acceptable sites.

Warren County citizens argued that the toxic waste landfill regulations were based on the fundamental assumption that the  EPA's conceptual dry-tomb landfill would contain the toxic waste. This assumption informed the siting of toxic waste landfills and waivers to regulations that were included in EPA's Federal Register. For example, in 1978, the base of a major toxic waste landfill could be no closer than five feet from groundwater, but this regulation and others could be waived. The waiver to the regulation concerning the distance between the base of a toxic waste landfill and groundwater allowed the base to be only a foot above ground water if the owner/operator of the facility could demonstrate to the EPA regional administrator that a leachate collection system could be installed and that there would be no hydraulic connection between the base of the landfill and groundwater. Citizens argued that the waivers to the siting regulations were discriminatory mechanisms facilitating the shift from scientific to political considerations concerning the siting decision and that in the South this would mean a discriminatory proliferation of dangerous waste management facilities in poor black and other minority communities. They also argued that the scientific consensus was that permanent containment could not be assured. As resistance to the siting of the PCB landfill in Warren County continued and studies revealed that EPA dry-tomb landfills were failing, EPA stated in its Federal Register that all landfills would eventually leak and should only be used as a stopgap measure.

Years of research and empirical knowledge of the failures of the  Warren County PCB landfill led citizens of Warren County to conclude that the EPA's dry-tomb landfill design and regulations governing the disposal of toxic and hazardous waste were not based on sound science and adequate technology. Warren County's citizens concluded also that North Carolina's 1981 Waste Management Act'' was scientifically and constitutionally unacceptable because it authorized the siting of toxic, hazardous, and nuclear waste facilities prior to public hearings, preempted local authority over the siting of the facilities, and authorized the use of force if needed.

In the aftermath of the Warren County protests, the 1984 Federal Hazardous and Solid Waste Amendments to the Resource Conservation and Recovery Act focused on waste minimization and phasing out land disposal of hazardous waste as well as corrective action for releases of hazardous materials. Other measures included in the 1984 amendments included increased enforcement authority for EPA, more stringent hazardous waste management standards, and a comprehensive underground storage tank program.

The disposal of toxic waste continues to be a source of conflict in the U.S. Due to the hazards associated with toxic waste handling and disposal, communities often resist the siting of toxic waste landfills and other waste management facilities; however, determining where and how to dispose of waste is a necessary part of economic and environmental policy-making.

The issue of handling toxic waste has become a global problem as international trade has arisen out of the increasing toxic byproducts produced with the transfer of them to less developed countries. In 1995, the United Nations Commission on Human Rights began to notice the illicit dumping of toxic waste and assigned a Special Rapporteur to examine the human rights aspect to this issue (Commission resolution 1995/81). In September 2011, the Human Rights Council decided to strengthen the mandate to include the entire life-cycle of hazardous products from manufacturing to the final destination (aka cradle to grave), as opposed to only movement and dumping of hazardous waste. The title of the Special Rapporteur has been changed to “Special Rapporteur on the implications for human rights of the environmentally sound management and disposal of hazardous substances and wastes."(Human Rights Council 18/11). The Human Rights Council has further extended the scope of its mandates as of September 2012 due to the result of the dangerous implications occurring to persons advocating environmentally sound practices regarding the generation, management, handling, distribution, and final disposal of hazardous and toxic materials to include the issue of the protection of the environmental human rights defenders.

Mapping of toxic waste in the United States
TOXMAP was a geographic information system (GIS) from the Division of Specialized Information Services of the United States National Library of Medicine (NLM) that used maps of the United States to help users visually explore data from the United States Environmental Protection Agency's (EPA)  Superfund and Toxics Release Inventory programs. The chemical and environmental health information was taken from NLM's Toxicology Data Network (TOXNET) and PubMed, and from other authoritative sources. The database was removed from the internet by the Trump Administration in December 2019.

See also
Agent Orange
Environmental dumping
Environmental racism
Environmental remediation
List of Superfund sites in the United States
Pollution
Radioactive waste
Red mud, a caustic byproduct of alumina production
Toxic colonialism

References

External links
 Information on toxic waste from the CDC
 TOXMAP: Environmental Health e-maps from the US National Library of Medicine 
 Toxic waste Argentinian law

 Burden of Disease Resulting from Lead Exposure at Toxic Waste Sites in Argentina, Mexico and Uruguay.

 Illegal Dumping of Toxic Waste and Its Effect on Human Health in Campania, Italy
 Millions of Americans live near toxic waste sites. how does this affect their health?

Waste
Pollution
 

de:Giftmüll